The 2013 New York City Marathon was the 43rd running of the annual marathon race in New York City, United States, which took place on Sunday, November 3. It followed a one-year hiatus after the 2012 event was canceled due to Hurricane Sandy. Geoffrey Mutai of Kenya won the men's division with a time of 2:08:24, his second consecutive win in New York. Priscah Jeptoo, also from Kenya, won the women's division with a time of 2:25:07. The two winners each received $100,000 in prize money, with Jeptoo capturing the World Marathon Majors title for $500,000.

In the women's wheelchair division, Tatyana McFadden of the United States completed a historic sweep of the Boston, London, Chicago, and New York marathons in the same year, winning in 1:59:13. She became the first person to win four major marathons in a single calendar year. Switzerland's Marcel Hug won the men's wheelchair division in 1:40:14.

Jimmy Jenson became the first person with Down syndrome to run the entire New York City Marathon, and Joy Johnson became the oldest woman to do so at age 86.

A record high of 50,740 runners participated, of which 50,062 finished the marathon (30,536 men and 19,526 women). This was the largest number of participants of any marathon in history. This was the final race for marathon record holder Joy Johnson.  The marathon also saw its one millionth overall starter since its start in 1970. The marathon was sponsored by ING Group.

Organization
Security was notably increased at the marathon, following the Boston Marathon bombing, with baggage screenings, surveillance helicopters, and inspection of runners, among other measures.

Race summary
The wheelchair division was scheduled to start at 8:30 a.m. EST, the elite women's division at 9:10 a.m., and the elite men's division at 9:40 a.m. The last wave of runners was scheduled to start at 10:55 a.m. At 9:00 a.m., the temperature at the starting line was a cool and windy , with a headwind for much of the race, which approached  and hampered the runners.

Women's division

After the first , Bizunesh Deba, the eventual second-place finisher, and Tigist Tufa, the eventual eighth-place finisher, had taken a significant lead, 80 seconds ahead of the rest of the pack. At  into the race, Deba and Tufa were 3 minutes ahead of the rest of the pack. Eventual winner Priscah Jeptoo trailed by 3:30 at the halfway point. Deba and Tufa maintained their lead after , as the race entered Manhattan.

Jeptoo closed to 1:30 behind the lead by the  mark, after breaking from the pack on the Queensboro Bridge. With  left, Deba was still in first place, while Jeptoo had overtaken Tufa for second place and drawn to 38 seconds behind Deba. Jeptoo caught up to Deba in Central Park just before  into the race, then overtook Deba to win the race, finishing 48 seconds ahead in 2:25:07.

Men's division

After the first , Meb Keflezighi, the eventual 23rd-place finisher, led with a time of 15:42. The men's race had a tighter lead pack than the women's for the first , when Geoffrey Mutai, the eventual winner, and Stanley Biwott, the eventual fifth-place finisher, broke away from the pack. Mutai and Biwott continued to lead the pack after . Mutai then pulled ahead of Biwott to lead by 9 seconds after , and led him by 33 seconds after . Biwott fell back to finish fifth, while Mutai maintained his lead to win the race in 2:08:24, finishing 52 seconds ahead of second-place Tsegaye Kebede.

Results

Men

Women

† Ran in mass race

Wheelchair men

Wheelchair women

Handcycle men

Handcycle women

References

Results
New York City Marathon 2013 Race Results. New York Road Runners. Retrieved 2020-05-09.
Men's results. Association of Road Racing Statisticians. Retrieved 2020-04-11.
Women's results. Association of Road Racing Statisticians. Retrieved 2020-04-11.

External links

New York Road Runners website

2013
New York City
Marathon
New York City Marathon